Klaus Böhle (born 14 January 1936) is a German sprint canoer who competed in the mid-1960s. He finished sixth in the C-2 1000 m event at the 1964 Summer Olympics in Tokyo.

References
Sports-reference.com profile

1936 births
Canoeists at the 1964 Summer Olympics
German male canoeists
Living people
Olympic canoeists of the United Team of Germany
Place of birth missing (living people)
20th-century German people